Ian Grant Branfoot (born Gateshead, 26 January 1947) is an English former footballer and manager.

He played as a defender, and after starting at Gateshead joined Sheffield Wednesday, making his Football League debut in 1965. After 42 senior appearances for the club he left in 1969–70 for Doncaster Rovers. He made over 150 League appearances for Rovers, and after moving to Lincoln City in 1973–74, he went on to make over 150 league appearances for the Imps as well.

Branfoot was manager of Reading from 31 January 1984 to 23 October 1989,. He must rank as one of Reading's most successful managers, leading Reading to promotion from Division 4 to Division 3 in 1984 based on the good work of Maurice Evans, and then promotion from Division 3 to Division 2 as champions in 1986. This last achievement included a record breaking start to the season of 13 straight wins. The club maintained a 13th position the next season but were relegated in 1988. However, in the same season that they won the Full Members Cup beating Luton Town 4–1 at Wembley.

He became manager of Southampton in June 1991, remaining in this position until January 1994. He then managed Fulham between 1994 and 1996. Branfoot later had a spell at Sunderland as academy director and at Leeds United as a scout. He also coached at Winchester College.

References

External links
 Sheff Wed player stats at Adrianbullock.com

1947 births
Living people
Footballers from Gateshead
English footballers
English Football League players
Sheffield Wednesday F.C. players
Doncaster Rovers F.C. players
Lincoln City F.C. players
English football managers
English Football League managers
Premier League managers
Reading F.C. managers
Southampton F.C. managers
Fulham F.C. managers

Sunderland A.F.C. non-playing staff
Leeds United F.C. non-playing staff
Association football fullbacks